James Frawley (born 29 March 1994) is an Australian tennis player.

Frawley has a career high ATP singles ranking of 606 achieved on 27 May 2019. He also has a career high ATP doubles ranking of 289 achieved on 19 December 2022.

Frawley made his ATP main draw debut at the 2015 Malaysian Open in the doubles draw partnering Nick Kyrgios.

ITF Futures/World Tennis Tour Finals

Doubles: 15 (10–5)

External links

1994 births
Living people
Australian male tennis players
Tennis people from the Australian Capital Territory
20th-century Australian people
21st-century Australian people